Þórunn Sveinbjarnardóttir (born 22 November 1965) is an Icelandic politician. A graduate of the University of Iceland and the Bologna Center of the Paul H. Nitze School of Advanced International Studies, she was Iceland's Minister for the Environment from 24 May 2007 to 2009. She was member of the Althing (Iceland's parliament) from 1999 to 2011, first elected as a member of Women's List, then the Social Democratic Alliance.

References 

Members of the Althing
Environment ministers of Iceland
Icelandic feminists
Sveinbjarnardottir, Thorunn
Sveinbjarnardottir, Thorunn
Social Democratic Alliance politicians
Women's List politicians
Women government ministers of Iceland